Bozaba can refer to:

 Bozaba language
 Bozaba, Dicle